Mambo Kurt (born Rainer Limpinsel;  11 April 1967 in Hagen) is a German comedy and novelty act who performs covers of mainstream and classic rock hits.

Mambo has performed at the Wacken Open Air festival and provides music for a German television show called Verona's World. Mambo Kurt performs on a home organ and changes the style of the song into a Bossa Nova, Samba or Polka style song. He also recruits his nearly 80-year-old home organ teacher, Heidi Schultz, to sing covers of The Sex Pistols, Anarchy In The UK, and The Rolling Stone's Sympathy For The Devil on his latest live album, Sun Of A Beach.

Despite not being known worldwide, Mambo Kurt has gained a large fanbase, most notably the bands Clawfinger and Rammstein. and has appeared repeatedly on television.

Since Mambo Kurt has a degree in medicine, he is a licensed doctor and thus helped as a vaccinator in 2021 during the Corona crisis.

Discography

Albums 
Weihnachten (2014, Metalville, 14 Tracks)
Spiel Heimorgel Spiel (2007)Organized Crime (album) (2005)Sun of a Beach - The Return of Alleinunterhalter vol. 5 (2004)Ekstase - The Return of Alleinunterhalter vol. 4 (2002)Back in Beige - The Return of Alleinunterhalter vol. II (2002)The Return of Alleinunterhalter (1999, Virgin Music, 15 Tracks)The Return of Alleinunterhalter (1998, Stamm & Belz Records, 19 Tracks)Lieder zur Weihnachtszeit'' (not available anymore) (1998)

See also
Eläkeläiset

Notes

External links

 Official Homepage

1967 births
Living people
German male musicians
German parodists
Parody musicians
People from Hagen